The 2017 Hawaii Rainbow Warriors football team represented the University of Hawaii at Manoa in the 2017 NCAA Division I FBS football season. The Rainbow Warriors played their home games at Aloha Stadium in Honolulu. They competed in the West Division of the Mountain West Conference and were led by second-year head coach Nick Rolovich. They finished the season 3–9, 1–7 in Mountain West play to finish in a tie for fifth place in the West Division. This marked the seventh straight losing season, continuing a school record, compiling a record of 29-62 since 2011.

Schedule
Although NCAA rules allow Hawaii to play a 13-game regular season, only 12 games were scheduled for Hawaii's 2017 season.

☆Spectrum Sports Hawaii simulcast the UMass game. The game was available on Spectrum Sports Hawaii statewide and was not part of the teams PPV package.

Game summaries

at UMass

Western Carolina

at UCLA

at Wyoming

Colorado State

at Nevada

San Jose State

San Diego State

at UNLV

Fresno State

at Utah State

BYU

Roster

References

Hawaii
Hawaii Rainbow Warriors football seasons
Hawaii Rainbow Warriors football